Kapaleh Hasan (also Romanized as Kapaleh Ḩasan; also known as Gīl Ḩasan, Kablasān, Kaplasan, and Kolbeh Ḩasan) is a village in Lahijan Rural District, in the Central District of Piranshahr County, West Azerbaijan Province, Iran. At the 2006 census, its population was 233, in 38 families.

References 

Populated places in Piranshahr County